Suzanne Georgina Pitama is a New Zealand academic, is Māori, of Ngāti Kahungunu and Ngāti Whare descent and as of 2020 is a full professor at the University of Otago in Christchurch, New Zealand.

Early life
Pitama was educated at Wairoa College, and qualified in psychology at University of Auckland. She then undertook postgraduate and doctoral studies at Massey University and the University of Otago.

Academic career 
Pitama was already a registered clinical psychologist before she completed the first-ever PhD undertaken in indigenous medical education, submitting her thesis, "As natural as learning pathology": the design, implementation and impact of indigenous health curricula within medical schools, at the University of Otago in 2013. Pitama was promoted to full professor from February 2020. In December 2021, she was appointed Dean and Head of Campus at the University of Otago, Christchurch, effective February 2022.

Pitama's research focuses on indigenous experiences in the health system, and how medical education can improve health disparities.

Awards 
In 2015, Pitama received the AKO Aotearoa Prime Minister's Supreme Award for tertiary teaching excellence. In 2017 Pitama featured as one of the Royal Society Te Apārangi's 150 women in 150 words. Pitama was also awarded the 2018 Metge Medal for 'excellence and building relationships in the social science research community'.

Pitama is the Director of the Māori/Indigenous Health Institute (MIHI) at the University of Otago.

In February 2022, she became university's first Māori female Dean of a medical school campus, when she became the Dean and Head of Campus at the University of Otago, Christchurch.

Selected works

References

External links 

 
 

Living people
New Zealand women academics
Year of birth missing (living people)
University of Otago alumni
Academic staff of the University of Otago
New Zealand Māori women academics
Ngāti Kahungunu people
Ngāti Whare
University of Auckland alumni
Massey University alumni
People educated at Wairoa College